Maria Rúbies i Garrofé (November 21, 1932 in Camarasa, Noguera – January 14, 1993 in Lleida) was a teacher of Catalan politics. After the Spanish Civil War she settled in Os de Balaguer and afterwards in Lleida. She attended high school in Lleida and then graduated in 1957 with a degree in mathematics from the University of Barcelona.

References
 Biografia per Carme Amorós Basté
 Biografia a enciclopedia.cat
 Fitxa del Senat
 Fitxa del Congrés dels Diputats, amb biografia
 Article necrològic, a La Vanguardia

External links
Maria Rúbies i Garrofé (1932-1993) by Carme Amorós Basté

1932 births
1993 deaths
Spanish educators
Spanish women educators
People from Noguera (comarca)
People from Lleida